The BlackBerry Style 9670 is a mobile phone developed by Research In Motion. The Style is BlackBerry's first flip phone with a full QWERTY keyboard. It was BlackBerry's second phone to ship with the BlackBerry 6.0 operating system. The Style earned a CNET Editors' Rating of Very Good with a mention of the phone's impressive call quality.

The Style was discontinued from the Boost Mobile lineup in October 2011.

References 

Mobile phones introduced in 2010
Portable media players
Style